Guerville is a commune in the Yvelines department in the Île-de-France region in north-central France.

History
Henri, count of Guerville, went to Jerusalem on crusade in the 12th century. On his return he established the priory of Secqueval, of which only ruins of the chapel remain.
One holder of the title served under Louis XIV, as the head of royal hunting (the "Grand Écuyer of France").
At the time of the French revolution, the last male heir fled to London where his wife died. He returned to France with his two daughters and was buried in Ferrières-en-Gâtinais.

See also
Communes of the Yvelines department

References

Communes of Yvelines